This article shows the rosters of all participating teams at the Boys' U19 World Championship 2019 in Tunisia.

Pool A

The following is the Belarusian roster in the 2019 FIVB Volleyball Boys' U19 World Championship.

Head Coach: Kavaliou Aliaksei

The following is the Brazilian roster in the 2019 FIVB Volleyball Boys' U19 World Championship.

Head Coach: Fabiano Preturlon Ribeiro

The following is the Chinese Taipei roster in the 2019 FIVB Volleyball Boys' U19 World Championship.

Head Coach: Teng-Chi Wang

The following is the Cuban roster in the 2019 FIVB Volleyball Boys' U19 World Championship.

Head Coach: Mario Raul Izquierdo Perez

The following is the Tunisian roster in the 2019 FIVB Volleyball Boys' U19 World Championship.

Head Coach: Ameur Nasraoui

Pool B

The following is the Bulgarian roster in the 2019 FIVB Volleyball Boys' U19 World Championship.

Head Coach: Plamen Hristov

The following is the Colombian roster in the 2019 FIVB Volleyball Boys' U19 World Championship.

Head Coach: Carlos Felipe Osorio Arboleda

The following is the Czech roster in the 2019 FIVB Volleyball Boys' U19 World Championship.

Head Coach: Jindrich Licek

The following is the Iranian roster in the 2019 FIVB Volleyball Boys' U19 World Championship.

Head Coach: Mohammad Vakili

The following is the Italian roster in the 2019 FIVB Volleyball Boys' U19 World Championship.

Head Coach: Vincenzo Fanizza

Pool C

The following is the Argentinian roster in the 2019 FIVB Volleyball Boys' U19 World Championship.

Head Coach: Pablo Rico

The following is the Egyptian roster in the 2019 FIVB Volleyball Boys' U19 World Championship.

Head Coach: Hassan Elhossary

The following is the German roster in the 2019 FIVB Volleyball Boys' U19 World Championship.

Head Coach: Matus Kalny

The following is the Japanese roster in the 2019 FIVB Volleyball Boys' U19 World Championship.

Head Coach: Hiroshi Honda

The following is the Mexican roster in the 2019 FIVB Volleyball Boys' U19 World Championship.

Head Coach: Gabriela Isela Alarcón Gómez

Pool D

The following is the Dominican roster in the 2019 FIVB Volleyball Boys' U19 World Championship.

Head Coach: Loren Ricardo Rodriguez Martinez

The following is the Korean roster in the 2019 FIVB Volleyball Boys' U19 World Championship.

Head Coach: Kang Soo-young

The following is the NGRerian roster in the 2019 FIVB Volleyball Boys' U19 World Championship.

Head Coach: Sani Mohammed Musa

The following is the Russian roster in the 2019 FIVB Volleyball Boys' U19 World Championship.

Head Coach: Mikhail Nikolaev

The following is the American roster in the 2019 FIVB Volleyball Boys' U19 World Championship.

Head Coach: David Hunt

See also
2019 FIVB Volleyball Girls' U18 World Championship squads

References

External links
Official website

FIVB Volleyball Boys' U19 World Championship
FIVB Boys' U19 World Championship
International volleyball competitions hosted by Tunisia
2019 in Tunisian sport